Vendetta in Camargue (French: Vendetta en Camargue) is a 1950 French comedy drama film directed by Jean Devaivre and starring Jean Pâqui, Jean Tissier and Brigitte Auber.

The film's sets were designed by the art director Robert Hubert. It was shot on location in Saint-Gilles-du-Gard.

Synopsis
A young woman inheritants a bull-breeding farm in the Camargue region of Southern France but faces problems both from her resentful male workforce and by a series of thefts of cattle and horses from the estate.

Cast
 Jean Pâqui as Frédé
 Jean Tissier as Hurchart
 Brigitte Auber as Huguette
 Thomy Bourdelle as Krebs
 Jacques Dufilho as Zacramir
 Rosy Varte as Conchita
 Daniel Sorano as Daniel Tiersot
 Mady Berry as Mme Hurchart

References

Bibliography 
 Bessy, Maurice & Chirat, Raymond. ''Histoire du cinéma français: encyclopédie des films, 1940–1950. Pygmalion, 1986

External links 
 

1950 films
1950 comedy films
French comedy films
1950s French-language films
Films directed by Jean Devaivre
Films scored by Joseph Kosma
1950s French films